In the run up to the Costa Rican general election scheduled to take place in 2022, various organisations carry out opinion polling to gauge voting intention in the country. Results of such polls are displayed in this article. The date range for these opinion polls are from the previous general election, held in 2018, to the present day.

Presidential election

First round

Graphic summary

Table of values

Second round

Graphic summary

Table of values

Presidential primaries

National Liberation Party

Social Christian Unity Party

Citizens' Action Party

Legislative election

Graphic summary

"None" option included

"None" option excluded

2021

Before 2021

References

2022